Moloya Goswami is an Indian actress who works in Assamese cinema. In the 39th National Film Awards 1992, she won the Best Actress award for her performance in the Firingoti.

Personal life
Moloya married Pradip Goswami in 1981. The couple has two daughters, Nimisha Goswami and Nishita Goswami, who is also an actress.

Filmography
Calendar (2017)
Bhal Pabo Najanilu (2013)
Poley Poley Urey Mon (2011)
Srimanta Sankardeva (2010)
Jeevan Baator Logori (2009)
Konikar Ramdhenu (Ride on the Rainbow) (2003)
Daman: A Victim of Marital Violence (2001)
Firingoti (The Spark) (1992)
Uttarkaal (1990)
Siraj (1988)
Sarbajan (1985)
 Maa (1986)
Agnisnaan (1985)

References

External links
 

Actresses in Assamese cinema
Living people
Best Actress National Film Award winners
20th-century Indian actresses
Indian film actresses
Actresses from Assam
Year of birth missing (living people)